Meioglossa pentochra is a moth in the family Oecophoridae. It is found in Australia, where it has been recorded from New South Wales, Queensland, South Australia, Victoria and Western Australia.

References

Natural History Museum Lepidoptera generic names catalog

Oecophorinae